Achalgadh  is Ward No.9 of Balara Municipality in Sarlahi District in the Province No.2 of south-eastern Nepal. At the time of the 1991 Nepal census it had a population of 2,497 people living in 467 individual households.

References

External links
UN map of the municipalities of Sarlahi  District

Populated places in Sarlahi District